Gina Lagorio (June 18, 1922 in Bra – July 17, 2005 in Milan) was an Italian writer.

References

Italian women novelists
20th-century Italian women writers
20th-century Italian novelists
21st-century Italian women writers
21st-century Italian novelists
People from Bra, Piedmont
1922 births
2005 deaths